American Translation is a 2011 French adult film directed by Pascal Arnold and Jean-Marc Barr and Pierre Perrier and Lizzie Brocheré.

Synopsis
Christophe and Aurore live a carnal and passionate love. Aurore discovers that Chris is actually a serial killer and this discovery pushes her to question the choices made in life. She runs away from a serious relationship from Dawn and fall in love with him. Meanwhile, Chris starts forming relationships with gay men and kills them afterwards.

Cast

References

External links 
 
 

French drama films
Male bisexuality in film
2011 LGBT-related films
2011 films
2010s French films
French LGBT-related films
LGBT-related drama films
2011 drama films